David K. Barnhart (born 1941) is an American lexicographer who specializes in new words.  He began his career helping his father, Clarence Barnhart, edit the Thorndike-Barnhart dictionary series.

In 1980 he founded Lexik House Publishers.  In the 1980s Lexik House published ТРОйКА--The TROIKA Introduction to Russian Letters and sounds (c. 1980) by Reason A. Goodwin, the Dictionary of Bahamian English (c. 1982) by John A. Holm with Alison Watt Shilling, and in 1987 The Dictionary of Gambling and Gaming by Thomas L. Clark.

In 1982 he, with his father, began work on The Barnhart Dictionary Companion, a quarterly publication documenting appearance of new words, new meanings and new usages in English.  This carries on the tradition of the Barnhart Dictionary of New English series (edited by his father, brother Robert Barnhart, and Sol Steinmetz), which was last published in 2001.  He wrote Neo Words:  A Dictionary of the Newest and Most Unusual Words of Our Time (1991).  He created The Barnhart New-Words Concordance (1994) and its Supplement (2006), an index to the words contained in numerous new word dictionaries, which has been updated quarterly since 1994.

With Allan A. Metcalf, he wrote America in So Many Words: Words that have shaped America (1997). He has worked as a teacher, lecturer, and as an expert witness reporting on usage and meaning in English words.

His collection of political words of the last couple of decades was published in December 2016.  The title is Barnhart's Never-finished Political Dictionary of the 21st Century and the publisher is Lexik House Publishers (Hyde Park, N.Y.).

He is a member and past president of the Dictionary Society of North America and the International Linguistic Association.  He is a member of the American Dialect Society.

References

External links

American lexicographers
1941 births
Living people
20th-century lexicographers
21st-century lexicographers